Profitis Ilias is a neighborhood of Athens, Greece.

Neighbourhoods in Athens